Augustinians Football Club is a football club from Banjul in the West African, state of Gambia. They play in the GFA League Third Division, which is the third league in Gambian football.

The club was founded in 1940 and in 1966 the team won their first GFA League First Division.

Stadium
Currently the team plays at the Banjul Mini-Stadium.

Honours
GFA League First Division
Winners (3): 1966, 1967, 1987

Performance in CAF competitions
African Cup of Champions Clubs
1967 – Preliminary Round
1968 – Preliminary Round

References

External links
Gambia – Foundation Dates of Clubs – rsssf.com
Championship & cup history – calciopedia.org

Defunct football clubs in the Gambia
Football clubs in the Gambia